
Year 350 BC was a year of the pre-Julian Roman calendar. At the time it was known as the Year of the Consulship of Laenas and Scipio (or, less frequently, year 404 Ab urbe condita). The denomination 350 BC for this year has been used since the early medieval period, when the Anno Domini calendar era became the prevalent method in Europe for naming years.

Events 
 By place 

 Persian Empire 
 Sidon, the centre of the revolt against Persia, seeks help from its sister city of Tyre and from Egypt but gets very little.
 Idrieus, the second son of Hecatomnus, succeeds to the throne of Caria on the death of Artemisia II, the widow of his elder brother Mausolus. Shortly after his accession, at the request of the Persian king, Artaxerxes III, Idrieus equips a fleet of 40 triremes and assembles an army of 8,000 mercenary troops and despatches them against Cyprus, under the command of the Athenian general Phocion.

 Greece 
 Alexander I becomes king of Epirus after his brother-in-law, Philip II of Macedon, aids him in ousting the previous king, Arymbas.
 Philip II has Abdera in Thrace sacked.

 Roman Republic 
 The Gauls, once more threatening Rome, are decisively beaten by an army comprising Rome and its allies.

 By topic 

 Science 
 Aristotle argues for a spherical Earth using lunar eclipses and other observations. Also he discusses logical reasoning in Organon.
 Plato proposes a geocentric model of the universe with the stars rotating on a fixed celestial sphere.

 Art 
 Praxiteles makes the Aphrodite of Knidos (approximate date). A composite of two similar Roman copies after the original marble is now kept at Musei Vaticani, Museo Pio Clementino, Gabinetto delle Maschere in Rome.
 The building of the Mausoleum in Halikarnassos (modern Bodrum in Turkey) is completed (approximate date). It is the grave of the Persian satrap and Carian ruler Mausolos and is built under the direction of his wife Artemisia. The mausoleum, which is considered to be one of the Seven Wonders of the Ancient World, is today partly preserved at the British Museum in London.
 The Corinthian capital is made in the tholos at Epidaurus. It is now preserved at the Archaeological Museum in Epidaurus, Greece (approximate date).

Births 
 Dicaearchus, Greek philosopher, cartographer, geographer, mathematician and polymath (d. c. 285 BC)
 Megasthenes, Greek historian, diplomat and Indian ethnographer (approximate date) 
 Shen Dao, Chinese philosopher known for his blend of Legalism and Taoism (approximate date) (d. c. 275 BC)

Deaths 
 Archytas, Greek philosopher, mathematician and statesman (or 347 BC) (b. 428 BC)
 Artemisia II, queen of Caria and sister and wife of king Mausolus of Caria
 Tollund Man, human sacrifice victim on the Jutland peninsula in Denmark, possibly the earliest known evidence for worship of the Norse god Odin (approximate date)

References